John Chipman may refer to:

John Chipman (Nova Scotia politician) (1744–1836), judge and politician in Nova Scotia
John Smith Chipman (1800–1869), lawyer and U.S. Representative from Michigan
John Logan Chipman (1830–1893), lawyer and U.S. Representative from Michigan
John Chipman (economist) (1926 ), Canadian economist
John Chipman (chief executive) (born 1957), director-general and chief executive of the International Institute for Strategic Studies